Thought blocking is a type of thought disorder in which a person will suddenly and involuntarily fall silent, or abruptly change to another subject.

When thought blocking, some people may express themselves in a manner that is not understandable to others. They may repeat words involuntarily or make up new words.

When doctors diagnose thought blocking they consider a variety of causes, such as schizophrenia,  anxiety, petit mal seizures, dissociation, bradyphrenia, aphasia, dementia or delirium.

Schizophrenia

Thought blocking occurs most often in people with psychiatric illnesses, most commonly schizophrenia. A person's speech is suddenly interrupted by silences that may last a few seconds to a minute or longer. When the person begins speaking again, after the block, they will often speak about an unrelated subject. Blocking is also described as an experience of unanticipated, quick and total emptying of the mind. People with schizophrenia commonly experience thought blocking and may interpret the experience in peculiar ways. For example, a person with schizophrenia might remark that another person has removed their thoughts from their brain.

When evaluating a patient for schizophrenia, a physician may look for thought blocking. In schizophrenia, patients experience two types of symptoms: positive and negative. Positive symptoms include behavior added on to a person's daily functioning. For instance, delusions, hallucinations, disorganized speech, disorganized behavior and thought are all positive symptoms. In contrast, negative symptoms are characterized by missing parts of the average individual's persona, including flat affect, apathy, speaking very little, not finding enjoyment in any activity, and not attending to basic acts of daily living (ADLs), such as bathing, eating, and wearing clean clothes.

Anxiety

Generalized anxiety disorder (GAD) is defined as excessive worry about matters in two or more separate subjects for at least six months. When a person experiences an anxiety attack, they may become so hyperfocused on the distressing stimuli and/or overwhelmed with the situation that regular speech is difficult for that person to produce. The thought blocking that occurs in this instance is usually short lived because anxiety attacks are transient. After an episode occurs, a person is typically able to resume their normal way of speaking.

Seizures

Thought blocking is associated with petit mal seizure. As such, it can be hard for people to organize their speech, resulting in thought blocking.

Dissociation and Post-traumatic stress disorder (PTSD)

Post-traumatic stress disorder (PTSD) is a psychiatric disorder that can occur after a person experiences a traumatic event and is significantly handicapped because of it, and can develop inappropriate coping strategies. These maladaptive approaches can include, but are not limited to, dissociative symptoms: depersonalization and derealization. When these dissociative symptoms surface, they can be extremely intrusive and result in a person not being able to focus on their diction, or manner of speaking, and result in thought blocking. People with PTSD may find that blocking of thought occurs more often if they have not addressed the source of their PTSD.

Cognitive & Motor Disorder

In older adults, blocking of thought can be a feature of several cognitive and motor disorders, including underlying dementia and delirium. It is common that as a person ages, they may become forgetful and/or lose their train of thought. When it becomes more persistent and affects one's ability to carry out their ADLs (activities of daily living), a major neurocognitive disorder like dementia is among the possible causes. In addition, thought blocking can occur in patients with parkinsonism, a disorder that features slowing of movement, muscle rigidity, and impairment. The distinguishing feature between parkinsonism and Parkinson's disease is that the causes of parkinsonism are numerous, including drugs, toxins, metabolic disorders, and head trauma. Furthermore, a stroke can result in a disordered speech process such as thought blocking. When a stroke affects the middle cerebral artery (MCA), it can result in damage to the Wernicke's area or Broca's area. As such, people afflicted can understand speech well but have problems saying the words they want to, or be able to speak but have nonsensical syntax and word choice. These symptoms are referred to as aphasias, and aphasias can present with thought blocking.

References

Thought disorders